Jahmil French (July 29, 1991 – March 1, 2021) was a Canadian actor, most noted for his role as Dave Turner in Degrassi: The Next Generation (2009–2013), for which he received a Canadian Screen Award nomination for Best Performance in a Children's or Youth Program or Series at the 1st Canadian Screen Awards in 2013.

Life and career
French was born on July 29, 1991. He attended the Wexford Collegiate School for the Arts in Scarborough, Ontario.

French was in the film Boost, for which he was nominated for Best Supporting Actor at the 6th Canadian Screen Awards in 2018.

French died on March 1, 2021, at the age of 29. Neither the circumstances nor the cause of his death were disclosed.

Filmography

Film

Television

References

External links

1991 births
2021 deaths
Place of birth missing
Black Canadian male actors
Canadian male child actors
Canadian male film actors
Canadian male television actors